Kana TV is an Ethiopian satellite television channel owned by Dubai-based Moby Group. It was co-founded by three Ethiopian entrepreneurs in combination with Moby Media Group and was officially launched on April 4, 2016. Kana TV produces voice-over translation by dubbing foreign content to Amharic. The channel has specialized at serial dramas especially Turkish television dramas, which gain overall exceeding rate in its market share, becoming the most popular television channel in Ethiopia.

Kana TV broadcast throughout the region by Nilesat and recently began its transmission on Ethiosat. The channel operates solely in the Amharic language with part of the content being locally produced and the other half being dubbed content. The source of its popularity is the multitude dubbed foreign TV dramas it broadcasts. Among the most famous are Turkish dramas such as Kuzey Güney (Kuzi Guni), O Hayat Benim (Yetkema Hiwot), Kara Para Aşk (Tikur Fikir), Zalim Istanbul (Shimya), Cennet'in Gözyaşları (Yaltabese Emba) and Mrs. Fazilet and Her Daughters (Ye Fazilet Lijoch). It has offices located in Addis Ababa, Ethiopia, with plans to expand its studios to make room for locally produced content.

Ethiopian TV market 
Due to the relative infancy of the television market in Ethiopia at the time of its launch, Kana TV had to commission its own studies on television viewership in the country. These studies revealed that a majority of viewers were watching foreign language content with channels like MBC 1 and Al Jazeera being some of the most popular. The success of its dubbed content was largely built on this fact that there was a large appetite for foreign content in Ethiopia that was waiting to be satisfied.

In March 2017, Kana TV released the first independently conducted all encompassing TV market study after launching its channel. According to this study Kana TV had gained a 34% market share and 8 of the top 10 highest rated prime time shows were on Kana TV (as of March 2017).

Programming 

#Time, #Mindin, Kana News and Sheqela are amongst locally produced programmes. Kana Passport/National Geographic is the sole documentary program of the channel translating to Amharic, and Hop is musical television program broadcasting both national and international hits.

Criticism 
The channel has drawn criticism from conservative commentators who argue that over-consumption of foreign soap operas dubbed in Amharic will corrupt Ethiopian culture.  This led to different associations composed of concerned actors, directors, and writers to formally petitioned the government to shut down the channel prior to it being launched. While appeals to shut down the network were ignored, the Ethiopian Broadcasting Authority (EBA) did change its policies to mandate that most of the content in television channels in Ethiopia has to be locally produced content.

Surveys
Studies conducted of how Kana TV influence the popular culture within Ethiopian society. Using methodological stratified sampling, a survey took place in government and private schools at Nifas Silk-Lafto district in Addis Ababa with 363 students and 38 schoolteachers. By asking television viewing habits and their preference of television programs, the study aim to corroborate quantitative findings of the study. Among the result, majority of 63% people attentively watch the channel while 28% are moderate viewers. From this study, 64% students and 58% teachers are attentive viewers, while 27% students and 40% teachers and administrators are moderate viewers. About 9% of students and 3% teachers and administrators are infrequent viewers. The study also indicates that Kana TV is highly popular among students and teachers. The study also conducted with gender difference by using 20 circumspect statements put in 3 – point scale. The survey finds uniform results as effect on popular culture. Most of them who favored positive attitude toward the channel are attentive students, teachers and administrators, though tiny people   negatively view the channel also exist.

Notes

References

Television channels in Ethiopia
Television channels and stations established in 2016
Television controversies in Ethiopia
Satellite television